Ko Geuntae (born March 30, 1987) is a South Korean professional Go player.

Biography 
Ko Geuntae won the Chunwon title in 2005. Due to his Chunwon win, he was given an automatic berth into the 19th Fujitsu Cup. He beat top ranked Chinese professional and holder of the LG Cup, Gu Li, in the China-Korea Tengen. Ko won the series two games to one. He reached 9 dan in 2015.

Titles

External links
Sensei's Library Profile
Korea Baduk Association profile (in Korean)

1987 births
Living people
South Korean Go players